Xanthophyllum subcoriaceum is a plant in the family Polygalaceae. The specific epithet  is from the Latin meaning "somewhat leathery", referring to the leaves.

Description
The hard smooth bark is whitish or brownish. The flowers are white, drying orange.

Distribution and habitat
Xanthophyllum subcoriaceum is endemic to Borneo. Its habitat is lowland swamp forest and mixed dipterocarp forest from sea-level to  altitude.

References

subcoriaceum
Endemic flora of Borneo
Plants described in 1973